A list of films produced by the Marathi language film industry based in Maharashtra in the year 2005.

2005 Releases
A list of Marathi films released in 2005.

References

Lists of 2005 films by country or language
 Marathi
2005